Mercedes Herrera Graf was born in Chicago, Illinois, USA.  She is a former professor of psychology, an American military historian, and a historian of medicine.  She previously taught at the Illinois School of Professional Psychology where she was also the director of clinical school psychology and the Child & Adolescent Clinic; professor and director of school psychology Governors State University, University Park, Illinois.

Graf is now an independent scholar, who resides in Highland Park, Illinois.  Her book On the Field of Mercy provided the first comprehensive overview of the role of women medical volunteers in early American wars.

Education
She holds a doctorate from the University of Illinois at Champaign-Urbana.  She received her master's degree from Chicago State University and her undergraduate degree from Loyola University of Chicago.

Book reviews
 On the Field of Mercy :  Women Medical Volunteers from the Civil War to the First World War, Reviewed by Judy Dalgo, Journal of the History of Medicine and Allied Sciences, Vol. 68, No. 2, [April 2013].
 On the Field of Mercy, reviewed by Teresa M. O'Neill (professor, Our Lady of Holy Cross College, New Orleans, LA.) in AAHN, Vol. 21, 2013.
 Women Doctors in War : reviewed by Robert S. Driscoll, Journal of Military History; Oct2010, Vol. 74 Issue 4, p 1289. Reviewed by Kara Dixon Vuic, The American Historical Review, Volume 115 (4) – Oct 1, 2010.

Bibliography

Books

 

 biographical fiction on Typhoid Mary
 She wrote the Introduction to "HIT: Essays on Women's Rights" by Mary E. Walker, M.D., Classics in Women's Studies, Humanity Press, 2003,

References

External links
 
 Picture of her for part of presentation of Women in Medicine; Library of Congress, American Memory Collection; listed by Governors State University, Adventure of the American Mind Partners.
 Margaret Craighill Collection finding aid
Mercedes Graf used the Craighill Collection, held at the U.S. Army Heritage and Education Center in Carlisle, Pa., for her research. Craighill was the first woman commissioned officer in the United States Army Medical Corps.

Living people
Historians of World War II
American military historians
American women historians
Writers from Chicago
Year of birth missing (living people)
People from Highland Park, Illinois
Historians from Illinois